Real Democracy (PDR) was a political party in Aruba.

Election history
The party was founded by Andin Bikker on 20 August 2004. In the 2005 elections for the Estates on 23 September 2005, the party won 3,98% of the popular vote, but failed to win a seat.

In the 2009 elections on 25 September 2009, the party won a single seat.

In the 2013 elections, the party managed to keep their one seat. The party did not participate in the 2017 elections, instead merging with the POR party.

References

External links

Political parties in Aruba